The 2020 Guernsey general election took place on 7 October 2020 to elect 38 members of the States of Guernsey. Originally scheduled to be held in June 2020, it was delayed a year to 2021 due to the COVID-19 pandemic before being brought forward to its final date. This election was the first on the island to include political parties, as the first ones were organised and registered in 2020.

On 16 October 2020, Peter Ferbrache was elected president of the Policy and Resources Committee by a vote of 23–17, ahead of incumbent Gavin St Pier.

Timetable
 21 August: Last day the public was able to register to vote / Electoral roll closed
 1 September: Candidate nomination period opened
 4 September: Deadline (4pm) for the delivery of candidate nomination papers
 25 September: Deadline (midnight) to apply for a postal vote
 3–6 October: Advance "super" polling stations are open
 6 October: Advance parish polling stations are open
 7 October: Polling day (polling stations open at 8 am and close at 8 pm) 6am deadline for posting postal ballots.
 8 October: Counting of votes
 10–11 October: Recount

Electoral system
The electoral system was changed as a result of a 2018 referendum. The 38 members of the States will be elected from a single island-wide constituency by plurality-at-large voting, with voters being able to cast up to 38 votes.

Prior to the elections, the age for candidates to stand was reduced from 20 to 18. The voting age is 16. Campaign spending per candidate was also reduced from £9,000 to £6,000.

For the first time, a Guernsey election was scrutinised by a team of international observers who will produce two reports on the process.

Candidates
A total of 119 candidates filed nominations. There were 28 female candidates (24%), which was an increase over the previous two elections, with 10 of 12 current female deputies standing for re-election. Twenty-nine candidates in total stood for re-election. The election was the first including political parties, as the first parties were organised in 2020.

Rick Lowe, a candidate for the Guernsey Party, withdrew from the election following a medical diagnosis.

All but 6 candidates provided a manifesto for printing in a book which was then sent to every address that had a registered voter. The book and the mandates from the other 6 candidates were published on the election2020 website. A small number of candidates paid the cost of sending their expanded manifestos to registered voters.

Hustings
An all day public hustings event at Beau Sejour on Sunday 20 September with 116 candidates showed disappointing numbers of the public attending. Those that did were mainly elderly people, with Islanders thinking that having over 100 candidates makes it too difficult and time-consuming to research which candidates have acceptable views on matters of personal interest.

Postal votes
Over 21,000 postal votes were requested, representing over 67% of registered voters.

Results
The results were reported at 01:15 local time on Friday, 9 October. The new deputies will be sworn in on 16 October.

Four unsuccessful candidates who had polled within 493 votes (2% of voters) of the final elected candidate's votes requested a recount. The recount did not change the elected candidates but adjusted the number of voters from 24,647 to 24,627 with votes for a number of candidates increasing or decreasing by single digit amounts. The largest change for one candidate was 11 votes, while the number of rejected ballots increased by 67, two pairs of unelected candidates switched final positions and two candidates of the same surname were mixed up in the first count, receiving each other's count, which was fixed. 

The elected deputies will serve until the next general election in June 2025.

Summary results
A total of 18 deputies were re-elected, while 20 were newcomers. The number of female deputies fell from 12 to 8, with four re-elected and four new deputies, giving 21% female representation in the States.

Full results

 Withdrew for medical reasons

References

External links
 

Guernsey
2020 in Guernsey
Elections in Guernsey
Guernsey